Meryem Boz  (born 3 February 1988) is a Turkish volleyball player. She was chosen MVP of the CEV Tokyo Volleyball European Qualification 2020.

Career
Boz played for Fenerbahçe in the 2012 FIVB Club World Championship held in Doha, Qatar and helped her team win the bronze medal after defeating Puerto Rico's Lancheras de Cataño 3–0. She also won Challenge Cup with  Bursa BBSK in 2015. For the 2016/17 season, she played for the Turkish club Seramiksan. She will be playing as opposite spiker for Fenerbahçe in the 2022/23 season.

Awards

Individuals
 2014–15 CEV Women's Challenge Cup "MVP"
 2020 CEV Tokyo qualification "MVP"

National team
 2010 European League –  Bronze Medal
 2015 European League –  Silver Medal
 2017 European Championship -  Bronze Medal
 2018 Nations League -   Silver Medal
 2019 European Championship -  Silver Medal
 2021 Nations League -   Bronze Medal
 2021 European Championship -  Bronze Medal

Clubs
 2010–11 Polish Championship –  Runner-Up, with Atom Trefl Sopot
 2012 FIVB Women's Club World Championship –  Bronze Medal, with Fenerbahçe
 2012–13 Women's CEV Cup -  Runner-Up, with Fenerbahçe
 2014–15 CEV Women's Challenge Cup -  Champion, with Bursa BBSK
 2021 FIVB Women's Club World Championship -  Champion, with VakıfBank S.K.
 2021–22 CEV Women's Champions League  - Champion, with VakıfBank S.K.
 2021–22 Turkish Super Cup -  Champion, with Fenerbahçe Beko

See also
Turkish women in sports

References

1988 births
Living people
Turkish women's volleyball players
Turkish expatriate volleyball players
Turkish expatriate sportspeople in Poland
Expatriate volleyball players in Poland
Expatriate volleyball players in Thailand
Sportspeople from Eskişehir
Fenerbahçe volleyballers
İller Bankası volleyballers
Nilüfer Belediyespor volleyballers
Aydın Büyükşehir Belediyespor volleyballers
Galatasaray S.K. (women's volleyball) players
Volleyball players at the 2020 Summer Olympics
Olympic volleyball players of Turkey
20th-century Turkish sportswomen
21st-century Turkish sportswomen